The 2019 Heilbronner Neckarcup was a professional tennis tournament played on clay courts. It was the sixth edition of the tournament which was part of the 2019 ATP Challenger Tour. It took place in Heilbronn, Germany between 13 and 19 May 2019.

Singles main-draw entrants

Seeds

 1 Rankings are as of May 6, 2019.

Other entrants
The following players received wildcards into the singles main draw:
  Daniel Altmaier
  Filip Krajinović
  Yannick Maden
  Cedrik-Marcel Stebe
  Elias Ymer

The following players received entry into the singles main draw using their ITF World Tennis Ranking:
  Hernán Casanova
  Baptiste Crepatte
  Peter Heller
  Aslan Karatsev
  Arthur Rinderknech

The following players received entry from the qualifying draw:
  Attila Balázs
  Daniel Masur

The following players received entry as lucky losers:
  Kevin Krawietz
  Viktor Troicki

Champions

Singles

 Filip Krajinović def.  Arthur De Greef 6–3, 6–1.

Doubles

 Kevin Krawietz /  Andreas Mies def.  Andre Begemann /  Fabrice Martin 6–2, 6–4.

References

External links
Official Website

2019 ATP Challenger Tour
2019
2019 in German tennis
May 2019 sports events in Germany